The 1966 Georgia gubernatorial election was held on November 8, 1966. After an election that exposed divisions within the Georgia Democratic Party (giving the Georgia Republican Party a shot at the Governor's Mansion for the first time in the twentieth century), segregationist Democrat Lester Maddox was elected Governor of Georgia. The voting also brought future President Jimmy Carter to statewide prominence for the first time. The election was very close; Republican candidate Bo Callaway won a plurality of the popular vote, but lost the contingent election in the Georgia General Assembly to Maddox.

Democratic nomination 

Former Governor Ernest Vandiver was considered the favorite to return to his former job (although governors could not then succeed themselves, they could run again after leaving office), but he dropped out of the race because of health problems. That opened the door for former Governor Ellis Arnall, former Lieutenant Governor Garland T. Byrd, state Senator Jimmy Carter, and two segregationist businessmen, Lester Maddox and James H. Gray, Sr., to run for the Democratic nomination.

Gray, a Massachusetts native, publisher of the Albany Herald and founder of what is now Gray Television, was a former Georgia Democratic state chairman who defended segregation in his northern accent before the 1960 Democratic National Convention in Los Angeles. In the primary race, Maddox had often called upon Gray to leave the race, having said that his opponent was "going down like the Titanic". Gray remained in the race and finished fourth in the primary. He declared neutrality in the Maddox-Arnall runoff election, not openly supporting either candidate. However, one of Gray's associates, Roy V. Harris of Augusta, a member of the Georgia State Board of Regents, supported Maddox over Arnall. Gray supporters attempted to entice Maddox to leave the race with a $100,000 payment. Gray denied involvement in the scheme but would not, on Maddox's request, take a lie detector test.

Democratic primary election results 

The primary was held on September 13, 1966.

Pursuant to Georgia law, as no candidate received a majority of votes in the primary, a runoff was held on September 27.

Lieutenant Governor 

State House Speaker George T. Smith was the Democratic nominee for Lieutenant Governor of Georgia, after he defeated incumbent Peter Zack Geer in the primary. He went on to win the general election.

Republican nomination 

The Republican nominee was U.S. Representative Bo Callaway. He was the first Republican Representative from Georgia since Reconstruction.

No other Republicans sought down-ballot constitutional offices. State Senator Holden Eugene "Gene" Sanders of DeKalb County, a moderate Republican, sought to run for lieutenant governor, but Callaway said that Sanders did not follow the proper procedures. The Republican strategy was to shun all other statewide races for fear that a full ticket would unify the Democrats. The Atlanta Journal, which ultimately endorsed Callaway, claimed that key Republicans were a clique who hoped to build the party from the governor's office. The Athens Daily News depicted traditional Georgia Republican leaders as "would-be politicians [who viewed the party as] personal property and who made no real effort to expand into a broad-based and effective political organization."

General election results 

Some people were unhappy with both major nominees and took the "Go Bo" of Callaway's campaign, expanding it to "Go Bo, and take Lester with you".

Under Georgia law at the time, the Georgia General Assembly would be required to hold a contingent election if no candidate received a majority of the popular vote.  Persons opposed to the contingent election procedure filed an action in the United States District Court for the Northern District of Georgia, contending that a contingent election would violate the Equal Protection Clause of the Fourteenth Amendment to the United States Constitution.  The three-judge federal district court declared the Georgia contingent procedure unconstitutional and void on November 17, 1966, but less than a month later, on December 12, 1966, the United States Supreme Court reversed, and the contingent election went forward.

Maddox was elected on the first ballot despite losing the popular vote by 0.31%.

References 

1966
Gubernatorial
Georgia
November 1966 events in the United States
Jimmy Carter